Early Man is a 2018 stop motion animated sports comedy film directed by Nick Park, the creator of Wallace and Gromit, Creature Comforts, Chicken Run, and Shaun the Sheep, written by Mark Burton and James Higginson, and starring the voices of Eddie Redmayne, Tom Hiddleston, Maisie Williams, and Timothy Spall. The film follows a tribe of primitive Stone Age valley dwellers who have to defend their land from bronze-using invaders in a football match. The film premiered on 20 January 2018 at the BFI Southbank cinema.

Released theatrically on 26 January 2018 (in the UK), the film received positive reviews from critics, despite praise for the animation, voice acting, humor, and faithfulness to the sport, although some deemed it inferior to previous Aardman works. However, the film bombed at the box office, grossing just $54 million against the budget of $50 million, making it the lowest-grossing Aardman film since Flushed Away.

Plot
In 2 million B.C. during the Neo-Pleistocene era, an asteroid collides with Earth "near Manchester", causing the extinction of the planet's dinosaurs, but sparing a tribe of cavemen living near the impact site. Finding a roughly spherical chunk of the asteroid, the cavemen begin to kick it around because it is too hot to hold and invent the game of football.

"Several eras" later during the Stone Age, the impact site has become a lush valley, inhabited by a tribe of cavemen, including Dug and his pet boar Hognob. One day, Dug suggests to Chief Bobnar that they should try hunting mammoths instead of rabbits as they always do, but Bobnar brushes him off, insisting the uncoordinated tribe would be unable to catch mammoths.

An army led by Lord Nooth, a Bronze Age governor, drives the tribe out of the valley and into the surrounding volcanic badlands. Dug tries to attack them, but falls into a cart and is unknowingly taken to the Bronze city. There, he is mistaken for a football player. To escape, he challenges Nooth's elite local team to a match with the valley at stake and promises that the tribe will work in Nooth's mines forever if they lose. Nooth accepts, knowing that he can profit from the match.

Dug discovers that although his ancestors played football, the other members of his tribe are too dim to understand it. They get chased by a giant duck which ends up destroying their only ball. Later that night, Dug and Hognob sneak into the Bronze Age city to steal more balls, but are found out by a woman named Goona, who goes to the empty stadium to practise in secret. Resentful over the team's exclusion of women, she helps them steal some balls and agrees to coach the cavemen. Goona points out that the players on Nooth's team are talented but too egotistical to work together effectively. The cavemen improve in skill and teamwork under her coaching.

Queen Oofeefa sends a message bird informing Nooth of the consequences should the cave team wins. To demoralise Dug, Nooth has him brought to the mines and shows him cave paintings made by his tribe's ancestors who, although they had invented the game and taught other tribes to play it, proved so inept at football that they never won a single match to other tribes and eventually gave up the sport. Nooth then offers Dug a deal which he later agrees to. On the day of the match with Oofeefa in attendance, Dug announces his forfeiture as part of the deal which spares the rest of the tribe and agrees to take their place in the mines alone.

However, his reinvigorated teammates arrive on the now tamed giant duck to play the match. They are down 3–1 at half-time, but rally in the second half to tie the score. Nooth incapacitates the referee and takes his place, making biased calls in favour of the local team that leads to Bobnar, who is the cavemen's goalkeeper, being knocked out.

Hognob takes his place and blocks a penalty kick, and Dug scores using a bicycle kick to win the match for the cavemen, 4–3. The cavemen win their valley back with the respect of Oofeefa, the local team, and the crowd. Nooth tries to escape and steal the crowd's admission money, but Dug and Goona stop him with help from the giant duck. Nooth is arrested for his crimes and everyone gets their money back.

Goona and Nooth's elite team join Dug's tribe for a hunt, but they are frightened off by a rabbit pretending to be a woolly mammoth.

Voice cast
 Eddie Redmayne as Dug, a young Stone Age caveman.
 Tom Hiddleston as Lord Nooth, an evil governor of the Bronze Age City.
 Maisie Williams as Goona, a tomboyish vendor and football enthusiast in the Bronze City whom Dug befriends.
 Timothy Spall as Chief Bobnar, the chieftain of Dug's tribe.
 Miriam Margolyes as Queen Oofeefa, the queen of the Bronze Age City.
 Kayvan Novak as Dino, Lord Nooth's second in command and referee.
 Novak also voices Jurgend, the team captain of the Bronze City's football team.
 Rob Brydon as Brian and Bryan, football commentators in the Bronze Age City that work for Queen Oofeefa.
 Brydon also voices Message Bird, a pigeon who carries messages.
 Brydon also voices Gonad The Gaul, a member of the Bronze City's football team.
 Richard Ayoade as Treebor, a large and cowardly member of Dug's tribe who is constantly embarrassed by his mother.
 Selina Griffiths as Magma, a member of Dug's tribe who is the overbearing mother of Treebor.
 Johnny Vegas as Asbo, a fidgety member of Dug's tribe who often says "Champion".
 Mark Williams as Barry, a member of Dug's tribe who isn't bright and has a rock friend named Mr. Rock.
 Gina Yashere as Gravelle, an injury prone member of Dug's tribe.
 Richard Webber as Grubup, a hungry member of Dug's tribe who will eat anything.
 Simon Greenall as Eemak, a warm and funny member of Dug's tribe who the other tribe has trouble understanding.
 Greenall also voices Thongo, a strong and silent member of Dug's tribe who mostly responds with a grunt.
 Nick Park as Hognob, Dug's pet wild boar.

In addition to a rabbit that Dug's tribe constantly hunts every day, a Ceratosaurus and a Triceratops, similar to the ones animated by Ray Harryhausen from One Million Years B.C., are seen fighting each other at the opening of the film prior to the asteroid striking Earth. In the end credits, they go by the name Ray (Ceratosaurus), and Harry (Triceratops).

Production
In June 2007, two films were announced by Aardman, one of them being appropriately joked as an "untitled Nick Park film, which is not another Wallace & Gromit feature film." In May 2015, it was announced that the title of the film would be Early Man, and it would be financed by the British Film Institute for $50 million.

As with previous stop motion films created by Aardman, the characters in Early Man were developed over time with the voice actors to determine the way the characters look, move, and speak. The results were turned over to the film's 35 animators at the studio to work on individualising the characters. A crowd of people took part in an audio recording at the Memorial Stadium Home of Bristol Rovers.

The studio began Principal photography on the film in May 2016 and wrapped on 5 October 2017.

Competition
On 21 September 2017, a competition was launched on the CBBC television programme Blue Peter to design a prehistoric character inspired by Early Man, with the winner receiving the opportunity to see their character brought to life by Aardman, as well as receiving tickets to the premiere alongside the runners up. It closed on 12 October 2017, and the winner was announced in January 2018.

Release
Early Man was released in the United Kingdom on 26 January 2018, by StudioCanal. StudioCanal also distributed the film in France, Germany, Australia and New Zealand. In the United States, it was released on 16 February 2018, by Lionsgate, through its Summit Entertainment label. In Canada, It was released by eOne Films on the same day.

Reception

Box office
Early Man was a massive failure, grossing only $8.2 million in North America and $46.3 million in other territories (including $15.8 million in the United Kingdom) for a worldwide gross of $54.6 million, against its budget of $50 million, it was deemed a box office bomb.

North America 
In the United States and Canada, Early Man was released alongside Black Panther and was projected to gross $5–$7 million on its opening weekend at 2,494 areas. However, it made just $849K on its opening day, far below projections. It opened to just $3.1 million at the box office, and $4.2 million on its President's Day weekend, averaging just $1,279 per cinema. This placed it seventh, and with the fourth-worst opening for an animated movie playing in over 2,000 theatres at the time, below Delgo, All Dogs Go to Heaven 2 and Teacher's Pet. The poor opening was considered to be due to the simultaneous release of the highly anticipated Black Panther. Early Man dropped by 44.4% on its opening weekend, grossing $1.7 million and ranking tenth, while averaging $711 per theatre. On its third weekend, it dropped by 72.6% and dropped from 2,494 cinemas to just 897 cinemas. It made $486K on its third weekend, averaging just $542 per cinema.

International 
The film opened in the United Kingdom on 26 January 2018, and opened at fourth with $2.8 million, it stayed at fourth for another two weeks until moving down to sixth on its fourth week, making $2.1 million on its second weekend (dropping by 25.8%), and $1.5 million on its third week (dropping by 26.3%).

The top five international markets for the movie were United Kingdom ($15.7 million), France ($6.7 million), Spain ($3.3 million), Germany ($1.7 million) and Italy ($1.6 million).

Critical response
The website's critical consensus reads, "Early Man isn't quite as evolved as Aardman's best work, but still retains the unique visuals and sweet humor that have made the studio a favorite among animation enthusiasts."

On Metacritic, the film has a weighted average score of 68 out of 100, based on 39 critics, indicating "generally favourable reviews". Audiences polled by CinemaScore gave the film an average grade of "B" on an A+ to F scale.

Some critics claimed the film is an allegory for Brexit.

Accolades

Soundtrack

The soundtrack, titled Early Man: (Original Motion Picture Soundtrack), was released under Lionsgate on 26 January 2018, the same day the film was released.

The film's score was composed by Harry Gregson-Williams and Tom Howe. It marks as Gregson-Williams second collaboration with Park, after Chicken Run (2000), and his fourth overall collaboration with Aardman, which includes Flushed Away (2006) and Arthur Christmas (2011).

See also
 Chicken Run
 Wallace and Gromit
 Wallace & Gromit: The Curse of the Were-Rabbit
 Creature Comforts
 Flushed Away
 The Croods
 The Croods: A New Age
 Bend It Like Beckham
 Believe (2013 film)

References

External links

Early Man at Rotten Tomatoes
Early Man at Box Office Mojo

2018 animated films
2018 films
2010s adventure comedy films
2010s children's comedy films
StudioCanal films
Aardman Animations films
StudioCanal animated films
Animated buddy films
Animated films set in prehistory
British adventure comedy films
British animated speculative fiction films
British buddy films
British children's adventure films
British children's animated films
British children's comedy films
British sports comedy films
Clay animation films
Films about evolution
Films directed by Nick Park
Films scored by Harry Gregson-Williams
British association football films
Animated comedy films
Animated adventure films
Films about cavemen
Animated films about cavemen
2010s stop-motion animated films
2010s English-language films
2010s sports comedy films
2010s children's adventure films
2018 comedy films
Summit Entertainment films
Summit Entertainment animated films
2010s British films
2010s French animated films
2010s French films